Stephen Thomas Dartnell (died 1994) was a British actor, who appeared in several television programmes.  He is best known for his two 1964 appearances in the first season of Doctor Who. He portrayed Yartek, leader of the Voord, in The Keys of Marinus and John, a mineralogist who has been driven to mania, in The Sensorites. Dartnell also made appearances in the 1960 feature films Circle of Deception and Oscar Wilde. He was also a theatre director and was active with the Citizens Theatre in Glasgow.

Personal life 

As a gay young man during the early 1950s, Dartnell found himself the victim of homophobic abuse when a youth threw paint over him. The youth went home and told his father that the actor had propositioned him. The father went to the police and when it came to court, the judge threw it out for being indefensible and the father and son were fined for wasting police time and perjury. As a result, Dartnell was kicked out of Joan Littlewood's Theatre Workshop (as was Harry Greene for sticking up for him) but was supported throughout this ordeal by Harry H. Corbett.

Filmography

Film

Television

References

External links

Stephen Dartnell/Steven Dartnell at Theatricalia

1995 deaths
English male television actors
English male film actors
20th-century English male actors
English gay actors
Date of birth missing